List of Canadian High Commissioners to New Zealand. The High Commission in Wellington also includes diplomatic ties to the Cook Islands and Niue as part of its region of responsibility but is not formally accredited to either.

External links 

 Foreign Affairs Canada - List of Canadian High Commissioners to New Zealand

Canada and the Commonwealth of Nations
New Zealand and the Commonwealth of Nations
 
New Zealand
Canada